The Freak is a fictional character appearing in The Amazing Spider-Man comics published by Marvel Comics.

Publication history
The Freak is a villain who first appears in the "Brand New Day" storyline from The Amazing Spider-Man #552 and was created by Bob Gale and Phil Jimenez.

Fictional character biography
A drug addict nicknamed Freak is chased down by Spider-Man after attempting to steal from the poor at the soup kitchen where Spider-Man's Aunt May works. Freak stumbles into a laboratory owned by Curt Connors and injects himself with animal gene fluids, thinking that they are crystal meth. A chrysalis forms around Freak's body, and he later emerges as a skinless monster. After being shot at by police, he falls into the sewer and forms another chrysalis. Emerging as an animal hybrid and completely bulletproof, Freak tracks Spider-Man by his scent. After a violent confrontation, Freak gives in to his addictions and finds a meth lab. Spider-Man follows him. During the ensuing fight, the building is set ablaze. Freak is caught under the flaming debris, but survives and creates a new chrysalis, which has made him fireproof and even stronger. Freak emerges as an armadillo-like creature and again tries to kill Spider-Man. When Connors arrives with the quicklime necessary to incapacitate Freak, Spider-Man tricks him into thinking Connors has drugs. Freak tears open the bags and is covered in the quicklime. He again forms a chrysalis, with Spider-Man pouring quicklime over it, to permanently incapacitate him. The chrysalis is taken by a hazmat crew — which is later revealed to be an Oscorp research group.

Freak is next seen cut open and hooked up to machines in an Oscorp lab where scientists are using his unique abilities to cure various diseases. Norman Osborn injects him with a sample of the anti-venom antibodies to create "super-venom", a virus capable of killing millions with a single drop. He then uses the super-venom to re-power Mac Gargan who was "cured" of his symbiote by Anti-Venom. Osborn also mentions that Freak is incapable of becoming intoxicated because his body has adapted to his drug addiction by removing the pleasure center of his brain. In the confrontation between Spider-Man and Osborn, Osborn activates the building's self-destruction with Freak still inside. A search afterwards by Oscorp reveals "no signs of life", which made the team reason that Freak was killed, with Osborn immediately retorting, "Idiot. Think about it for a second".

During the "Origin of the Species" storyline, Freak is invited by supervillain Doctor Octopus to join his team in exchange for securing some specific items for him. Freak goes after Spider-Man for Menace's infant. He collides with Vulture (Jimmy Natale) before Rhino arrives. Spider-Man goes on a rampage against the villains after the infant is kidnapped from him by the Chameleon, and Spider-Man defeats Freak.

During the "Absolute Carnage" storyline, Freak was freed from Ravencroft upon its destruction. Alongside Will O' The Wisp and Conundrum, Freak was bonded to a copy of the Grendel Symbiote. He was apparently killed during his fight with Deadpool when his body overtaxed itself to adapt to Deadpool's attacks.

In the pages of the "Ruins of Ravencroft", Freak turns up alive and appears as an inmate at Ravencroft following its rebuilding.

Powers and abilities
The Freak can adapt to any situation by forming a chrysalis around himself after being wounded or killed, then returning to life in a different appearance. He also has Hulk-like bulletproof durability and strength and acidic saliva, can crawl on walls, can shoot toxic spores from his body at will, and can adapt to certain harsh environments.

References

External links

Comics characters introduced in 2008
Spider-Man characters
Fictional drug addicts
Marvel Comics characters with superhuman strength
Marvel Comics mutates
Marvel Comics characters with accelerated healing
Marvel Comics supervillains